Monster High is an American CGI-animated fantasy comedy children's television series based on Mattel's fashion doll franchise of the same name which premiered on Nickelodeon in the United States on October 6, 2022. Shea Fontana, who previously developed the 2018 reboot of Polly Pocket, is its showrunner.

Premise
The series follows Frankie Stein, Draculaura and Clawdeen Wolf, the respective children of Frankenstein, Dracula and a Werewolf, as well as other children of famous mythical monsters they navigate the hilarity of high school in the hallowed halls of Monster High.

Cast

 Gabrielle Nevaeh Green as Clawdeen Wolf
 Iris Menas as Frankie Stein
 Courtney Lin as Draculaura and Iris Clops
 Tony Revolori as Deuce Gorgon
 Kausar Mohammed as Cleo de Nile
 Valeria Rodriguez as Lagoona Blue and Spectra Vondergeist
 Alexa Kahn as Toralei Stripe
 Alexander Polinsky as Heath Burns
 Debra Wilson as Headless Headmistress Bloodgood
 Felicia Day as Ghoulia Yelps
 Ken Marino as Count Dracula
 Delbert Hunt as Mr. Wolf
 Darius Johnson as Barkimedes
 Scott Menville as Romulus
 Cole Massie as Finnegan Wake
 Victoria T. Washington as Howleen Wolf
 Jordan Coleman as Manny Taur
 Jonathan Melo as Clawd Wolf
 Aishwarya Pillai as Abbey Bominable 
 Devika Parikh as Ms. Bominable 
 Krystina Alabado as Nefera de Nile
 Sekai Murashige as Kuma
 Salli Saffioti as Mrs. O'Shriek
 Kayla Cromer as Twyla Boogeyman

Episodes

Production
On February 23, 2021, Mattel, through its television division, announced the second return of the Monster High brand, promising new content and products for the following year, including an animated TV series of 26 episodes and a live-action musical film.

Shea Fontana, previously the showrunner of the 2018 reboot of Polly Pocket, was announced as the series' showrunner and co-executive producer.

On July 13, 2022, the cast was announced with Gabrielle Nevaeh Green as Clawdeen Wolf, Courtney Lin as Draculaura and iris menas as Frankie Stein.

On September 26, 2022, the series' premiere date was revealed as October 28, 2022, but began airing earlier than planned on October 6; it was branded as a sneak peek after Monster High: The Movie.

On November 17, 2022, Nickelodeon renewed the series for a 20-episode second season.

Reception
Diondra Brown from Common Sense Media gave the series three-out-of-five stars, calling it "a funny and clever animated series, geared towards tween audiences."

References

External links
 
 

2020s American LGBT-related comedy television series
2020s American animated television series
2020s American high school television series
2020s Nickelodeon original programming
2022 American television series debuts
American children's animated comedy television series
American children's animated fantasy television series
American computer-animated television series
English-language television shows
Monster High
Nicktoons
Television series by Mattel Creations